Himayatnagar taluka is a taluka in Nanded district in the state of Maharashtra, India.

Nanded district
There were 16 talukas in Nanded district as of November 2014: Nanded, Ardhapur, Bhokar, Biloli, Deglur, Dharmabad, Hadgaon,  Himayatnagar, Kandhar, Kinwat, Loha, Mahur, Mudkhed, Mukhed, Naigaon, and Umri. In 1981, there were eight talukas in the district: Nanded, Hadgaon, Kinwat, Bhokar, Biloli, Deglur (Degloor), Mukhed and Kandhar.

References

Talukas in Nanded district
Talukas in Maharashtra